The 1926–27 season was the 22nd year of football played by Dundee United, and covers the period from 1 July 1926 to 30 June 1927.

Match results
Dundee United played a total of 43 matches during the 1926–27 season.

Legend

All results are written with Dundee United's score first.
Own goals in italics

First Division

Scottish Cup

References

Dundee United F.C. seasons
Dundee United